"Home Again" is a song by British soul musician Michael Kiwanuka, from his debut studio album Home Again. It was released as his debut single in the United Kingdom via digital download on 1 January 2012. On 8 January 2012 the song entered the UK Singles Chart at number 37, going on to 29 the following week.

Music video
A music video to accompany the release of "Home Again" was first released onto YouTube on 18 November 2011.

Track listing

Charts

Weekly charts

Year-end charts

Certifications

Release history

References

2011 songs
2012 debut singles
Michael Kiwanuka songs
Polydor Records singles
Songs written by Jamie Scott
Songs written by Michael Kiwanuka